Tolbaños de Arriba is a Spanish village in the province of Burgos. Located at 1257 meters above sea level in the Sierra de la Demanda, it is the highest village in the province. Administratively it belongs to the town of Valle de Valdelaguna.

References

Bibliography
 Boletín Oficial de la Provincia de Burgos, número 79 de 25 de abril de 2007

Towns in Spain